HM Prison Risley is a Category C men's prison, located in the Risley area of Warrington, Cheshire, England. The prison is operated by His Majesty's Prison Service.

History
Risley opened as a remand centre for male and female inmates in 1964. A category C prison opened on the site in 1990, alongside the remand centre. Risley ceased to hold females in April 1999, and in March 2000, Risley wholly re-roled to a category C prison for adult males.

In 1988 a report from His Majesty's Chief Inspector of Prisons described Risley as "barbarous and squalid", "appalling and totally unacceptable", "dirty and dilapidated".

A year later the conditions resulted in a serious outbreak of violence and rioting with some remand prisoners taking control of significant amounts of the prison for several days. It gave rise to a debate in the House of Commons and calls from the Home Secretary for an inquiry.

In September 2003, an inspection report from the Chief Inspector of Prisons criticised Risley Prison for its policy of mixing sex offenders with other inmates. The report said that sex offenders and other vulnerable inmates did not feel safe from attack by other inmates, and did not trust Prison Officers to protect them.

A further inspection report in July 2006 again highlighted issues over safety at Risley Prison. The inspection found that a third of inmates felt unsafe, with "a lack of visible staffing on wings when prisoners were unlocked from their cells." The report also highlighted concerns about the prisons anti-bullying, suicide and self-harm prevention work. However the report did praise Risley for reducing the quantity of drugs that were being smuggled into the prison.

In October 2008, another inspection report from the Chief Inspector of Prisons severely criticised Risley, stating that "a culture of hard drugs and violence remained rife at the prison", according to the BBC. Of inmates suspected of taking drugs, more than 60% tested positive, while gangs were rampant, offering new members with £50 joining fees.
 
The prison was inspected again in 2013.  The report stated that the prison was improving but there were still some areas which needed attention.  Prisoners felt safe and had received support for substance misuse but too many prisoners were locked in their cells during the day, on average about a third of the population.

The prison today

Risley is a category C prison for adult males. The prison holds vulnerable prisoners (mainly sex offenders) who are not mixed but kept separate from other prisoners. Accommodation at the prison comprises single and double occupancy cells with in-cell sanitation, and PIN phones as well as landing showers, serveries, and association facilities. In-cell mains power and in-cell TVs are installed throughout the prison.

Work for inmates at Risley includes the kitchen, laundry, stores, cleaning, gardens, waste management and the Braille workshop. In addition, inmates may train for vocations in painting and decorating, joinery, industrial cleaning and construction. Courses in art and design, information technology, and higher level learning (including the Open University programmes) are also available.

Other facilities at the prison include a gym and a multi-faith chaplaincy.

In November 2017 an improvised explosive device was found on one of the wings that did not go off. In December 2017, one of the wings at the prison was without water for a period of three days.

Notable inmates
Paddy Lacey, professional footballer
 Ted Hankey, professional darts player .
 Charles Bronson

References

External links
 Ministry of Justice pages on Risley

Category C prisons in England
Prisons in Cheshire
Buildings and structures in Warrington
1964 establishments in England
Men's prisons